Konstantinos Trigkonis (born 2 July 1970) is a Greek yacht racer. He competed in the 1996, 2000, 2004, and 2008 Summer Olympics.

References

External links
 

1970 births
Living people
Greek male sailors (sport)
Olympic sailors of Greece
Sailors at the 1996 Summer Olympics – 470
Sailors at the 2000 Summer Olympics – 470
Sailors at the 2004 Summer Olympics – 470
Sailors at the 2008 Summer Olympics – Tornado
Tornado class world champions
World champions in sailing for Greece